Peter Wherrett, (who late in life changed name to Pip Wilson ) (born 9 June 193623 March 2009) was an Australian motoring and motor sport journalist and race car driver.

Wherrett was born in Marrickville, New South Wales. He learned to drive when his parents got their first motor car when he was twelve. Frustrated, and then angry, at the lack of attention paid to motor sport by the newspapers Wilson wrote to all of the major newspapers around the country to complain.  Only The Sydney Morning Herald replied and he was subsequently hired to write for them - doing this throughout 1958 and 1959 on the sport.

Wherrett was best known as the presenter and co-writer of Torque, a popular motoring television show from 1973 to 1980.

Advanced driver training 
In 1967, Wherrett set up Australia's first post-licence driver training school as "Peter Wherrett Advanced Driving". In 1980 he sold the school to its manager, Peter Finlay.

Motor racing 
Wherrett raced in the Bathurst endurance race in 1969 in a Mazda, in 1970 in a Ford Falcon, and in 1974 and 1976 in Alfa Romeos.

Television 
From 1973, Wherrett presented the ABC TV program series Torque and later a historical series called Marque, which is the only television program on that topic to be produced for free-to-air television. During the 1980s, Wherrett explored the need to explore alternative energy sources in the series The Balance of Power. Wherrett also served as the motoring guru in the Channel Ten infotainment production Healthy, Wealthy and Wise, which aired from 1991 to 1999.

In 1974, Wherrett courted controversy on Torque, after he raised issues about the rear braking on the HJ model Holden Premier.

Wherrett was also a pit reporter for Channel 7's coverage of the 1983 James Hardie 1000 at Bathurst.

Wherrett Sigma 
In 1981, Mitsubishi Australia produced a limited edition "Wherrett Special" GH Series Sigma sedan. Only 1016 cars were produced, which were commissioned after Wherrett complained about the GH Sigma's woeful performance and handling. Wherrett was challenged to design a better car by Mitsubishi Chief Engineers in Japan.

Personal life 
Wherrett was married and divorced three times. His first marriage was to Denise Wirth. They had a son, Steven, and a daughter, Jane, and had six grandchildren. His second marriage was to Lesley Brydon, former Executive Director of the Advertising Federation of Australia. His third marriage was to Kim Mathers. When Mathers obtained employment in Europe as a chef, Wilson remained in Australia. Because of their physical separation, they decided to divorce amicably in 2006. Following that divorce, Peter sold the house that they had shared in Queensland and moved to Lake Macquarie in New South Wales.

Wherrett wrote a memoir entitled Desirelines with his brother Richard Wherrett, who died in 2001. The book recounted Wherrett's interest in cross-dressing. As a child, Wherrett discovered her mother being abused by their father which led to an "empathy for her mother as an abused life, and passion for women generally". She later discovered her father was also a cross-dresser and consulted a psychiatrist who said that such behavior was obsessive but harmless. Wherrett went on to write The Gender Trap which examined the "compulsive nature of cross-dressing and motorsport".

After Wherrett  and Mathers separated in 2006, Wherrett began presenting as female in public and adopted the name Pip Wilson. Wilson described the act of living a woman for the last two years of her life as "my last great achievement". Pip Wilson (formerly Peter Wherrett) died in 2009 from prostate cancer.

Bibliography
Peter Wherrett's A Century of the Motor Car 
Marque a Hundred Years of Motoring 
Torque 
Quest for the Perfect Car : My Life in Motoring
Motoring Skills and Tactics
Explore Australia BY Four-Wheel Drive with Kim Wherrett
What They Don't Teach You in Driving School  
Grit: An Epic Journey Across the World – the story of Francis Birtles epic 1927 journey. 
Wheels of Australia (editor)
Drive It! The Complete Book of High Speed Driving on Road And Track (1981)
 Desirelines: an unusual family Memoir (1997) with Richard Wherrett.

References

External links
Obituary – Sydney Morning Herald.

1936 births
2009 deaths
Deaths from cancer in New South Wales
Male-to-female cross-dressers
Deaths from prostate cancer
Motoring journalists
People educated at Trinity Grammar School (New South Wales)
People from Marrickville
People from the Hunter Region
Racing drivers from New South Wales
20th-century Australian journalists
The Sydney Morning Herald people
Australian LGBT sportspeople